William Chatterton Dix (14 June 1837 – 9 September 1898) was an English writer of hymns and carols. He was born in Bristol, the son of John Dix, a local surgeon, who wrote The Life of Chatterton the poet, a book of Pen Pictures of Popular English Preachers and other works. His father gave him his middle name in honour of Thomas Chatterton, a poet about whom he had written a biography. He was educated at the Grammar School, Bristol, for a mercantile career, and became manager of a maritime insurance company in Glasgow where he spent most of his life.

His original hymns are found in most modern hymn-books. He wrote also felicitous renderings in metrical form of Richard Frederick Littledale's translations from the Greek in his Offices of the Holy Eastern Church; and of Rodwell's translations of Abyssinian hymns. Some of his carols, such as The Manger Throne, have been very popular. His hymns and carols also include As with Gladness Men of Old, What Child Is This?, To You, O Lord, Our Hearts We Raise and Alleluia! Sing to Jesus.

At the age of 29 he was struck with a near fatal illness and consequently suffered months confined to his bed. During this time he became severely depressed. Yet it is from this period that many of his hymns date. He died at Cheddar, Somerset, England, and was buried at his parish church.

His children included writer Gertrude Dix.

References

External links
 
 
 

Writers from Bristol
1837 births
1898 deaths
English composers
English hymnwriters
Christian hymnwriters
Burials in Somerset
19th-century English musicians